Geoffrey King may refer to:

Geoffrey King (theologian), English Protestant theologian of the 17th century
Geoffrey King (composer) (born 1949), British composer of contemporary music
Geoffrey King (civil servant) (1894–1981), British civil servant
Geoffrey King (actor), British television actor of the 1950s and 1960s in Miss Mabel
Geoffrey Peter Thomas Paget King, English Old Catholic archbishop

See also
Jeff King (disambiguation)